Keep Going may refer to:

 "Keep Going", a 2015 song by Rachael Yamagata
 "Keep Going", a 2019 song by Syn Cole
 "Keep Going", a 2008 song by T-Pain from Three Ringz
 "Keep Going", a 2009 song by Taio Cruz from Rokstarr
 Keep Going, a 2020 album by Larry June and Harry Fraud
 Keep Going, a 2014 album by Pakho Chau
 Keep Going, a 2003 album by Stephen Duffy & The Lilac Time
 Keep Going, a 2019 mixtape by Mike Posner